Pumahuasi (hispanicized spelling of Quechua Puma Wasi, puma cougar, wasi house, "cougar house") is a rural municipality and village in Jujuy Province in Argentina.

References

Populated places in Jujuy Province